Maureen Elizabeth Drake (born March 21, 1971) is a Canadian former professional tennis player.

Her career-high WTA singles ranking is No. 47, which she reached on September 13, 1999. Her career-high doubles ranking is No. 77, set on October 30, 2006.

After Drake qualified for the round of 16 at the 1999 Australian Open, there was no Canadian to reach the fourth round of a Grand Slam event until Aleksandra Wozniak at the French Open in 2009.

Drake retired in April 2011 but returned to professional tennis in July 2014. In August 2016, she announced her second and permanent retirement from professional tennis.

WTA career finals

Doubles: 1 runner-up

ITF Circuit finals

Singles: 18 (6 titles, 12 runner-ups)

Doubles: 20 (8 titles, 12 runner-ups)

Grand Slam performance timelines

Singles

Doubles

Record against top-50 players
Drake's win–loss record (14–54, 21%) against players who were ranked world No. 50 or higher when played is as follows: Players who have been ranked world No. 1 are in boldface.

 Anne Kremer 4–1
 Patty Schnyder 1–0
 Gigi Fernández 1–0
 Anne Minter 1–0
 Barbara Rittner 1–0
 Kristina Brandi 1–0
 Sylvia Plischke 1–0
 Cara Black 1–0
 Marie-Gaïané Mikaelian 1–0
 Cho Yoon-jeong 1–0
 Tamarine Tanasugarn 1–1
 Kim Clijsters 0–1
 Lindsay Davenport 0–1
 Martina Hingis 0–1
 Amélie Mauresmo 0–1
 Venus Williams  0–1
 Nathalie Tauziat 0–1
 Mary Joe Fernández 0–1
 Ai Sugiyama 0–1
 Julie Halard-Decugis 0–1
 Brenda Schultz-McCarthy 0–1
 Eleni Daniilidou 0–1
 Kimberly Po 0–1
 Naoko Sawamatsu 0–1
 Karolina Šprem 0–1
 Patty Fendick 0–1
 Magüi Serna 0–1
 Natalia Medvedeva 0–1
 Nicole Bradtke 0–1
 Mana Endo 0–1
 Mariaan de Swardt 0–1
 Virginia Ruano Pascual 0–1
 Ann Grossman 0–1
 Ginger Helgeson-Nielsen 0–1
 Lindsay Lee-Waters 0–1
 Meilen Tu 0–1
 Carrie Cunningham 0–1
 Elena Tatarkova 0–1
 Anca Barna 0–1
 Steffi Graf 0–2
 Irina Spîrlea 0–2
 Silvia Farina Elia 0–2
 Elena Likhovtseva 0–2
 Tatiana Panova 0–2
 Katarina Srebotnik 0–2
 Clarisa Fernández 0–2
 Chanda Rubin 0–3
 Dominique Monami 0–3
 Amanda Coetzer 0–4

Notes

References

External links

 
 
 

1971 births
Living people
Canadian female tennis players
Tennis players from Toronto
Hopman Cup competitors